UnitedMasters is an American music distributor based in the United States founded by Steve Stoute in November 2017. UnitedMasters gives artists the ability to distribute music to all major streaming services. Distributed artists are eligible to participate in advertisements, brand partnerships, and other promotions that can earn them money and new fans. UnitedMasters gives artists access to their streaming and social data, this gives them information on how to maximize their fan engagement. The company claims to represent 1 million artists, one of the more notable being rapper NLE Choppa. On February 16, 2023, Baton Rouge, Louisiana rapper YoungBoy Never Broke Again noted that he owns a percentage of the company and has had several talks with Steve Stoute on Rap Radar, a music podcast.

History

Formation 
UnitedMasters was launched in November 2017 by Steve Stoute with a $70 million Series A led by Google's corporate umbrella Alphabet alongside venture firm Andreessen Horowitz and 21st Century Fox.

Music distribution 
In 2018, UnitedMasters rolled out the distribution feature on its platform titled Releases. The Releases feature allows artists to upload their music and album artwork and distribute their music to all major streaming services through the UnitedMasters platform.

In 2019, UnitedMasters announced the appointment of its first President, Lauren Wirtzer-Seawood. Wirtzer-Seawood formerly served as Head of Music Partnerships at Instagram. Prior to that, Wirtzer-Seawood spent two years as the Head of Digital at Beyoncé's entertainment and management company, Parkwood Entertainment.

In 2022, UnitedMasters distribute songs for FIFA World Cup Qatar 2022 by cooperating with several artists like Nora Fatehi, Rahma Riad, Balqees, Manal and RedOne.

Partnerships 
In 2018, UnitedMasters announced a global partnership with the NBA.

In early 2019, UnitedMasters artists helped launch the Bose Frames products by featuring the product in their music videos. UnitedMasters helped identify ambassadors for the campaign and Bose assisted in the development and promotion of each artist's music videos.

In a 2019 partnership with iHeartRadio and AT&T, UnitedMasters helped major radio stations including Power 105.1 in New York City and Real 92.3 in Los Angeles celebrate emerging artists in their cities. Through 'The Come Up Show' series, independent artists got the opportunity to submit music for the chance to receive major radio play, $25,000, and a distribution deal through UnitedMasters.

Also in 2019, UnitedMasters announced a partnership with NBA 2K20.

In June 2020, UnitedMasters has partnered up with Cash App to launch a new grant program called "Cash for Change", to highlight songs by artists that address social and political climate.

In August 2020, UnitedMasters and TikTok announced a partnership to allow TikTok artists to distribute their original songs through all streaming platforms, Spotify, Apple Music and YouTube among others. It will also allow artists to sign deals with brands like the NBA.

In September 2020, UnitedMasters has partnered up with Twitch to feature licensed music for creators. That also includes with CDBaby, Distrokid, and other music distributors.

In March 2021, UnitedMasters raised $50m in a Series B venture round. Funding was led by Apple Inc, with follow-on funding by Google's corporate umbrella Alphabet and Andreessen Horowitz.

In August 2021, UnitedMasters, Symphonic Distribution, and Horus Music partnered with music funding company, beatBread, to offer clients more access to capital. beatBread's chordCashAI technology provides an automated advance experience for independent musicians while enable clients to choose their own terms and retain ownership of their music.

Technology 
In July 2019, UnitedMasters unveiled its new iOS app which makes the features of the UnitedMasters platform available on mobile devices. The iOS app allows artists to easily distribute music directly from their text messages, Dropbox, or iCloud to major streaming platforms including Spotify, Apple, Tidal, and YouTube. Similar to the desktop platform, artists can view streaming stats, playlisting details, financial earnings, and social stats as well as access opportunities for brand partnerships.

References

External links
Official website

American companies established in 2017
Companies based in New York City
Companies based in San Francisco